The Punta Marguareis (It) or Pointe Marguareis (Fr) is a mountain in the Ligurian Alps, on the boundary between Italy and France; It is the highest peak of the Ligurian Alps.

Geography 
Administratively the Marguareis is divided between the Italian region of Piemonte (province: Cuneo) and the French region of Provence-Alpes-Côte d'Azur (department: Alpes-Maritimes).

SOIUSA classification 
According to the SOIUSA (International Standardized Mountain Subdivision of the Alps) the mountain can be classified in the following way:
 main part = Western Alps
 major sector = South Western Alps
 section = Ligurian Alps
 subsection = (It:Alpi del Marguareis/Fr:Alpes Liguriennes Occidentales)
 supergroup = (It:Catena Marguareis-Mongioie/Fr:Chaîne Marguareis-Mongioie) 
 group = (It:Gruppo del Marguareis/Fr:Groupe du Marguareis) 
 subgroup = (It:Nodo del Marguareis/Fr:Nœud du Marguareis) 
 code = I/A-1.II-B.2.a

Geology 

The Marguareis is part of a karst area where are located many caves very popular among speleologists.

References

Maps
 Italian official cartography (Istituto Geografico Militare - IGM); on-line version: www.pcn.minambiente.it
 French  official cartography (Institut Géographique National - IGN); on-line version:  www.geoportail.fr

Bibliography

External links 

 

Mountains of Piedmont
Mountains of Alpes-Maritimes
Mountains of the Ligurian Alps
France–Italy border
International mountains of Europe
Two-thousanders of France
Two-thousanders of Italy
Mountains partially in France